Kenneth Raydon Sharpe (born on January 27, 1973), is a Zimbabwean businessman, philanthropist and real estate developer. He is the CEO and Chairman of the board at West Property Zimbabwe He is also the first Zimbabwean to receive Forbes Africa Best of Africa Most Innovative CEO Award.

Background

Ken Sharpe was born in Harare, Zimbabwe and he grew up in Mazowe, Bulawayo and on Tafuna Mountain in Shamva. He was born to Kenneth Robert Sharpe and Elaine Loretta Sharpe in Harare. He is the great-great-grandson of Sir Joseph Wilson Swan. He attended his junior and senior school in Zimbabwe and South Africa.

Career
Sharpe started his business career in 1991 when he established the West Group, a confectionary and food distribution company which had operations in Zimbabwe, Zambia, Malawi, Mozambique and South Africa. With operations in South Africa, he also established InterAfrica Franchise Bottlers in South Africa.

In 2006, West Group in partnership with a Ukrainian businessman Oleksandr Sheremet, was renamed to West Properties Zimbabwe, which is a real estate development company with two notable projects, Kuwadzana 4 Extension a housing project of approximately 4,500 residential homes and Mainway Meadows of 2,300 homes. His company Westprop won the awards in Best Residential Development 20+units Zimbabwe and top Developers Zimbabwe categories at the African and Arabian Laufen International Property Awards 2022, in Dubai.

In 2005, Sharpe joined the World Economic Forum, Young Presidents Organisation (YPO) as the “Doing Business in Africa” and the “Family Philanthropy Network”, he was appointed chairman of the initiatives. He has previously served as the Chapter Forum Chair, Education Chair and was the youngest Chapter Chairman in 2008, he resigned this post in 2015.

In 2017, Sharpe teamed up with JW Oliver and co-founded a Tech company called Global BP Solutions through which he has invested in Solar IPPs in Ukraine. He was accepted into the prestigious HBS OPM 3-year program in 2019 and graduated as an Alumni in 2022. He also graduated from Harvard Business School and when he did his final dissertation on strategy, he launched the 1 Billion bricks by 2050 agenda.

In his business career of 20 years, the businesses Sharpe opened to form West Group include West Food Distribution, West Beverages, West Agencies, Intercrop, West Sanitary Pads Manufacturing, West Tech, West Oils, FellowGold Mining, West Star Cash n Carry and Augur Investments Ltd. These trading divisions has activities in the SADC region, including operations in Zimbabwe, Zambia, Malawi, Mozambique, and South Africa.

In 2022, Sharpe’s Augur Investments dismissed allegations of misappropriation of council land in response to the High Court challenging its mention in a land dispute. The Zimbabwe Anti-Corruption Commission had cleared Augur Investments and Ken Sharpe of any wrongdoing.

Personal life
Sharpe is married to Joanna, they got married in 1993 and have two children: a daughter and a son,  the latter who they fostered in 2008.

Awards 
Zimbabwe National Business & Leadership Awards – Entrepreneur of the year
The Zimbabwe Top 100 Business Brands of the year awards - Businessman of the Year
Forbes Best of Africa Innovative CEO of the year award 2021
 Zimbabwe National Chamber of Commerce - 2021 Businessman of the Year
Megafest Business Awards 2019 - Top 10 Men in Business of the Year
Megafest National Leadership Awards - Leader in Real Estate of the Year 2021 Platinum Award

References 

Zimbabwean businesspeople
People from Harare
1973 births
Living people